Florence H. Bucior (October 29, 1920 – November 13, 2005) was an All-American Girls Professional Baseball League player. She was born in Jackson, Michigan.

Bucior is part of the AAGPBL permanent display at the Baseball Hall of Fame and Museum at Cooperstown, New York opened in 1988, which is dedicated to the entire league rather than any individual figure.

Bucior died on November 13, 2005 at the age of 85.

Notes
Bucior appears as a member of the Peoria Redwings club during its 1946 inaugural season. Nevertheless, the league did not have additional information about her, and requires if someone has information regarding this player, please contact them at their website.

Sources

All-American Girls Professional Baseball League players
Peoria Redwings players
Baseball players from Michigan
Sportspeople from Jackson, Michigan
2005 deaths
1920 births
American female baseball players
20th-century American women
20th-century American people
21st-century American women